A party political foundation ( or Parteistiftung) in Germany is a state-subsidised political foundation that's affiliated to a political party.  There are seven foundations at the federal level: one for each party represented in the federal parliament (Bundestag). The major characteristics of all such organizations is that they do party related work like general information about the ideological cause, training of volunteers, publication of pamphlets and international aid for democracy building (in co-operation with partners around the world).

The party political foundations receive 95% of their funding from government grants, thus blurring the definition of 'non-governmental organisation'.  Most do not even have the legal status of 'foundation'.

Similar institutions have also been organized in the Netherlands, Austria, France and Greece. In the U.K. and the U.S. the general setup differs because institutions like the Westminster Foundation for Democracy, the National Democratic Institute (NDI) or the International Republican Institute (IRI) are limited to responsibilities in international aid. The same applies for the Netherlands Institute for Multiparty Democracy (NIMD).

List of foundations

Literature
 Pinto-Duschinsky, Michael, The Party Foundations and Political Finance in Germany. In: Seidle, Leslie F. (ed.), Comparative Issues in Party and Election Finance. Toronto, ON: Dundurn Press, 1991, pp. 179–250.      
 Lucardie, Paul/ Voerman, Gerrit, 'Party Foundations in the Netherlands', in: Nassmacher, Karl-Heinz (ed.), Foundations for Democracy. Approaches to Comparative Political Finance, Baden-Baden: Nomos, 2001, pp. 321–337.

See also
 Political foundation at European level
 Party finance in Germany
 Party funding in Austria
 Party funding in the Netherlands

Footnotes

Political parties in Germany
Political funding